Eli Gottlieb is an American author.  His first novel, The Boy Who Went Away, was published by St. Martin's Press, in 1997.  The novel debuted to widespread critical acclaim and earned Gottlieb the Rome Prize and the McKitterick Prize from the British Society of Authors in 1998.

Education and background

Gottlieb was born in New York City and raised in Cedar Grove, New Jersey. He graduated from Hampshire College.

Career

Gottlieb has taught American literature at the University of Padua Italy, written documentary films and worked as a senior editor at Elle magazine and as a staff writer for The Jewish Theological Seminary of America.

In 2008, Gottlieb's second novel, Now You See Him, was published by William Morrow.  Translated into eleven languages, the novel was named "Book of the Year" by The Independent (UK) and Bookmarks magazine.

His third novel, The Face Thief, was published by Morrow on January 17, 2012.

His fourth novel, Best Boy, was published by Liveright on August 24, 2015.

Personal
Gottlieb lives in New York City.

References

External links

 Official website
 Gottlieb's page on HarperCollins website
 Salon review of The Face Thief
 Eli Gottlieb's top 10 scenes from the battle of the sexes, ''The Guardian (UK), August 19, 2008
 The Irresistible Sway, Lincoln Center Theater Review, Spring 2005#
 Interview with Eli Gottlieb, fiction writer

Jewish American novelists
Living people
American male novelists
Academic staff of the University of Padua
Hampshire College alumni
Writers from New York City
Novelists from New Jersey
Elle (magazine) writers
People from Cedar Grove, New Jersey
Novelists from New York (state)
Year of birth missing (living people)
21st-century American Jews